Flag Day is a 2021 American drama film directed by and starring Sean Penn. His daughter Dylan Penn co-stars. It premiered in competition at the 2021 Cannes Film Festival. It was released on August 20, 2021, by United Artists Releasing. The film has received mixed reviews from critics.

Premise 

The daughter of a con artist struggles to come to terms with her father's past, involving the fourth-largest seizure of counterfeit bills in U.S. history, nearly $20 million. 

The film is based on Jennifer Vogel's 2004 memoir, Flim-Flam Man : A True Family History.

Cast 
 Dylan Penn as Jennifer Vogel
 Jadyn Rylee as teenage Jennifer
 Addison Tymec as younger Jennifer
 Sean Penn as John Vogel
 Katheryn Winnick as Patty Vogel
 Josh Brolin as Uncle Beck
 Hopper Penn as Nick Vogel
 Beckam Crawford as Nick as a younger child
 Regina King as U.S. Marshall Blake
 Norbert Leo Butz as Doc
 Dale Dickey as Grandma Margaret
 Eddie Marsan as Mr. Emmanuelle
 Bailey Noble as Debbie

Production 
In March 2012, Penn expressed interest in joining the cast of a Flim-Flam Man film adaptation directed by Alejandro González Iñárritu.

It was announced in March 2019 that a casting call for the film had been issued, with filming for the project due to commence in Winnipeg, Canada.

Filming began in June with the cast including Penn and his children Dylan Penn and Hopper Penn. Josh Brolin, Miles Teller and Katheryn Winnick were also among the cast announced. In July 2019, James Russo was confirmed as part of the cast. On August 1, 2019, scenes were filmed at the Fort Garry campus of the University of Manitoba. Filming took place at Piedras Blancas in San Luis Obispo County, California.

The film was produced by William Horberg, Jon Kilik and Fernando Sulichin.

In an interview with Deadline Hollywood at the 2021 Cannes Film Festival, Penn said that he initially thought that it would be something he might act in, but after trouble identifying the right director he took on the offer as it was a movie that he would have liked to see get made. It is the first film directed by Penn in which he also appears.

Release 
The film had its world premiere at the Cannes Film Festival in July 2021. Prior to the festival, Metro-Goldwyn-Mayer acquired U.S. distribution rights to the film, with plans to release it later that year through their joint venture, United Artists Releasing. It was released on August 20, 2021. It was previously scheduled to be released on August 13, but moved back a week to avoid competing with another MGM film, Respect.

Soundtrack 
The soundtrack to Flag Day features original music by Eddie Vedder, Glen Hansard and Cat Power. The first single, "My Father's Daughter" marks the musical debut of Vedder's then-17-year-old daughter Olivia, who also sings lead on the song "There's a Girl". The album with the thirteen-track soundtrack was released on August 20, 2021.

Controversy 
During promotion for the movie, Penn stated he didn't want anyone who chose not to be vaccinated against Covid-19 to be allowed to see the movie in theaters.

Reception

Box office 
Flag Day was released in 24 theaters and made $40,750 in its opening weekend. According to Deadline Hollywood, the film was targeting an "older, sophisticated demo." In its initial release, 56% of all audiences were over the age of 55, low numbers that were credited to the Delta variant. The film was screened in 50 theaters in its second weekend.

Critical response

References

External links 

 

 John Vogel:
 
 
 

2021 drama films
American drama films
American films based on actual events
Counterfeit money in film
Drama films based on actual events
Films about father–daughter relationships
Films about con artists
Films based on American novels
Films directed by Sean Penn
Films produced by Jon Kilik
Films set in 1975
Films set in 1981
Films set in 1985
Films set in 1992
Films set in Minnesota
Films shot in California
Films shot in Winnipeg
Films with screenplays by Jez Butterworth
Metro-Goldwyn-Mayer films
2020s English-language films
2020s American films